Joseph-Marie Bellenger (15 April 1788 – 6 May 1856) was a Catholic priest and missionary in Canada. In addition, he was active in journalism for a period.

Bellenger was notable, in part, for his work in journalism. One important period was from 1825 to 1830 when, along with Michel Bibaud, he was active with La Bibliothèque canadienne. He also wrote for and edited the Mélanges religieux for a short period.

References 
 Biography at the Dictionary of Canadian Biography Online

1788 births
1856 deaths
19th-century Canadian Roman Catholic priests